The Hispano-Suiza 12N was one of two new V-12 engine designs first run in 1928 and was manufactured by Hispano-Suiza's French subsidiary for the Armee d'l'Air. It powered the first non-stop flight from Europe to the United States.

Design and development

Up to 1927, Hispano-Suiza's many engine types, of various layouts and cylinder numbers, were all recognisable developments of the World War I V-8 Hispano-Suiza 8.  1927-8 saw the introduction of four completely new engines, two V-12s and two with six cylinders inline. Apart from capacity and power, these two engines had much in common. The 12M first ran in 1927 and the 12N a year later.

Both 12M and 12N were 60° V engines with carburettors, inlets and exhausts on the outer faces.  There were three carburettors per bank, each charging a pair of cylinders.  Much of the new technology was in the cylinder design: these types introduced wet liners, an Hispano automobile engine innovation which brought the cooling water into direct contact with the steel cylinder barrel rather than by screwing it into an aluminium water jacket.  This improved cooling,  simplified assembly and allowed larger cylinder bores without increasing their separation.  The cylinder barrels were open at top and bottom and threaded for screwing into the block only near the top, with valve seats ground into the aluminium cylinder head. The lower end of the barrel extended into the crankcase, simplifying both manufacture and assembly.  Block and crankcase were bolted together.

The 12M and 12N engines were the first to use the gas nitriding surface hardening process on the cylinder walls, which reduced both wear and oil consumption.  They also used a novel, complicated but effective method of main bearing cooling, enhancing the local lubricant flow without requiring high overall oil pump speeds.

Both types were designed so that Epicyclic gearing could be added or removed quickly; some earlier Hispano-Suiza engines offered gearing but as a permanent fixture on a specific sub-type.  The gears added  to the weight. In 1935 the 12Ner variant was fitted with an in-flight- electrically operated variable pitch propeller.

The 12N series was developed into the 12Y (Type 73) supercharged engine, first run in 1932.

Operational history
A Hispano-Suiza 12Nb powered the Breguet XIX Point d'Interrogation on the first non-stop flight from Paris to New York in September 1930. This was the first east to west flight between Europe and the United States, rather than to the North American continent.

In the early 1930s, 12N engines powered the flying boats operating the French Atlantic and African routes.

The Swiss government, in the form of the KTA (Kriegstechninischen Abteilung or War Technical Department) purchased construction licences for the 12Nb and in 1932 eighty units were built at the Saurer lorry factory.

Variants
Data from Hispano Suiza in Aeronautics.
12Nb/650 Compression ratio 6.2, maximum power  at 2,100 rpm.
12Nbr/650 Compression ratio 6.2, maximum power  at 2,100 rpm. Gearing ratio of 2:1 or 1.61:1.
12Ns Compression ratio 7, nominal power  at 2,200 rpm. For Schneider Cup 1928.
12Nsr Compression ratio 10, nominal power  at 2,400 rpm. For Schneider Cup 1931. Farman compressor.
12Nc Compression ratio 6.2, nominal power  at 2,000 rpm. For Ford 14A Trimotor.
12Ncr
12Ndr Electrically controlled pitch propeller, anti-clockwise turning (1935).
12Ner As 12Ndr, modified with articulated connecting rods.
12Nfr As Ndr, clockwise turning.
12Ngr As Ner, clockwise turning.

Applications

Specifications (12Nbr/650)

See also

References

1920s aircraft piston engines
Hispano-Suiza aircraft engines